Big Bus Tours (formerly Les Cars Rouges and The Big Bus Company), is the largest operator of open top bus sightseeing tours founded in May 2011 after "Les Cars Rouges" and the "Big Bus Company" merged. The company operates in 23 cities of 11 countries with more than 150 buses around the world. The United States is the country with the largest number of cities with Big Bus Tours service. Typically, Big Bus Tours use open top double-decker buses in burgundy and cream-coloured livery.

History

"Les Cars Rouges" was founded in 1990 by Abdallah El Azm in Paris, France. Over the course of the next two decades, it went on to operate in Paris, Rome, Washington DC, Las Vegas, San Francisco, Miami, and Istanbul. 
The "Big Bus Company" first started operating in London, England in June 1991 with four buses by the Maybury family. It later expanded to Dubai, Abu Dhabi, Hong Kong, Shanghai, Philadelphia, and so on.

"Les Cars Rouges" and "the Big Bus Company" merged in May 2011, and formed "Big Bus Tours". Les Cars Rouges was the larger of the two companies, but for international namesake purposes, the name "Big Bus" was retained.

In May 2007, the Abu Dhabi company the Al Fahim Group purchased a 30% shareholding.

In February 2015, the business was sold to Exponent Private Equity. In February 2016, Merlin Entertainments bought a 15% shareholding.

Overview of operation
Buses travel near major landmarks around the town or city it tours. Pre-recorded or live commentary about the landscape is provided through small headphones worn by each passenger. Users may leave the bus and board again without limit (hop-on, hop-off) at special bus stops on a circular route. In large cities, buses go on more than one route. In some cities (such as Hong Kong) some variants of the ride include travelling by boat.

Operations by country

Australia
 Big Bus Darwin
 Big Bus Sydney

Austria
 The Big Bus Vienna

France
 Big Bus Paris

Germany 

 Big Bus Berlin
 Big Bus Munich

Hong Kong

 Big Bus Hong Kong
On 15 December 2008, The Big Bus Hong Kong was established. With the largest fleet of open-top buses in the city, it serves three sightseeing routes: Hong Kong Island (Red Tour), Kowloon (Blue Tour) and Stanley (Green Tour). The tour offers a wide range of packages which include free travel on the Peak Tram, entry to the Sky Terrace on Victoria Peak, a traditional Sampan ride, and a Star Ferry harbour tour.

Hungary
 Big Bus Budapest

Italy
 Big Bus Rome

Ireland
 Big Bus Dublin
In August, 2018, Big Bus Dublin was officially launched with the most up to date fleet in the city. It offers 2 separate tours: Red (city centre and Phoenix Park) and Blue (city centre including Docklands, Glasnevin Cemetery and Croke Park Stadium).

Oman
 Big Bus Muscat

Singapore

 Big Bus Singapore (operates 3 routes) (established on 14 January 2011, using Scania K230UB double-decker buses)

Big Bus Tours bought over local sightseeing tour operator Duck & Hippo in September 2018.

Turkey
 Big Bus Istanbul

United Arab Emirates
 Big Bus Dubai
 Big Bus Abu Dhabi
In 2002, The Big Bus Tours Dubai was established. The buses used are traditional open-top double-decker buses. The tour visits numerous sights throughout the Emirate; including the Wafi Mall, Dubai Creek, Creekside Park, Dubai Museum, The Old Souq, Sheikh Saeed Al Maktoum House, Heritage & Diving Village, Dubai Gold Souk, Deira City Centre, Jumeirah Mosque, Souq Madinat Jumeirah, Burj Al Arab, the Palm Dubai Mall, and the Burj Khalifa.

United Kingdom
 Big Bus London

The Big Bus Tours London operates three routes with stops at these tourist destinations: Madame Tussauds, Oxford Circus, Piccadilly Circus, Trafalgar Square, Whitehall, Westminster Bridge, London Eye, Covent Garden, St Paul's Cathedral, London Bridge, Tower of London, Westminster Abbey, Buckingham Palace, Harrods, Kensington Palace and Kensington Gardens.

United States

 Big Bus Chicago
 Big Bus Las Vegas
 Big Bus Los Angeles
 Big Bus Miami
 Big Bus New York
 Big Bus Philadelphia
 Big Bus San Francisco
 Big Bus Washington, D.C.

Gallery

See also
City Sightseeing
List of bus operators of the United Kingdom
Open top buses in the United Kingdom

References

External links

London Bus Routes Zenfolio
Showbus gallery

Bus companies of Hong Kong
Transport companies established in 1991
London bus operators
Merlin Entertainments Group
Tourism in Dubai
Tourism in Hong Kong
Tourism in London
Tourism in Shanghai
Travel and holiday companies of the United Kingdom
1991 establishments in England
City Sightseeing